Vladimir Ivanovich Seleznev (August 3, 1928, in Leningrad, USSR – 1991 in Leningrad, USSR) was a Soviet Russian realist painter, lived and worked in Leningrad, member of the Leningrad branch of Union of Artists of Russian Federation, regarded by art historian Sergei V. Ivanov as a representative of the Leningrad school of painting, most famous for his genre paintings and portraits.

Biography 
Vladimir Ivanovich Seleznev was born August 3, 1928, in the Leningrad, USSR.

In 1953 Vladimir Seleznev graduated from Ilya Repin Institute in Rudolf Frentz workshop. He studied under Mikhail Platunov, Ivan Stepashkin, Piotr Belousov, and Yuri Neprintsev.
 
Since 1951 Vladimir Seleznev has participated in Art Exhibitions. He painted portraits, landscapes, battle and historical paintings, genre scenes,  and etudes done from nature.
 
Vladimir Seleznev was a member of Leningrad Union of Artists since 1953.

Vladimir Ivanovich Seleznev died on March 15, 1991, in Leningrad. His paintings reside in Art museums and private collections in Russia, USA, France, England, and throughout the world.

References

Bibliography 
 Directory of members of the Leningrad branch of Union of Artists of Russian Federation. - Leningrad: Khudozhnik RSFSR, 1987. - p. 116.
 Matthew C. Bown. Dictionary of 20th Century Russian and Soviet Painters 1900-1980s. - London: Izomar, 1998. , .
 Anniversary Directory graduates of Saint Petersburg State Academic Institute of Painting, Sculpture, and Architecture named after Ilya Repin, Russian Academy of Arts. 1915 - 2005. - Saint Petersburg: Pervotsvet Publishing House, 2007. - p. 71.  .

1928 births
1991 deaths
Soviet painters
Leningrad School artists
Members of the Leningrad Union of Artists
Socialist realist artists
Repin Institute of Arts alumni